Museum for Daegu National University of Education is a museum in Nam-gu, Daegu, South Korea.

The museum opened 29 October 1975; it has 6,247 common relics, and 169 national relics.

References

Museums in Daegu
Museums established in 1975
Archaeological museums in South Korea
Museum for Daegu National University of Education
University museums in South Korea